José Baviera (17 August 1906 – 13 August 1981) was a Spanish film actor. He appeared in more than 190 films and television shows between 1924 and 1979. He starred in Luis Buñuel's 1962 film The Exterminating Angel.

Selected filmography

 The Cursed Village (1930)
 Barrios bajos (1937)
 Jesús de Nazareth (1942)
 The Shack (1945)
 María Magdalena: Pecadora de Magdala (1946)
 The Private Life of Mark Antony and Cleopatra (1947)
 Reina de reinas: La Virgen María (1948)
Dueña y señora (1948)
La familia Pérez(1949)
 Lola Casanova (1949)
 Philip of Jesus (1949)
 The Magician (1949)
 The Devil Is a Woman (1950)
 The Doorman (1950)
 El derecho de nacer (1951)
 A Galician Dances the Mambo (1951)
 Desired (1951)
 The Martyr of Calvary (1952)
 The Plebeian (1953)
 When You Come Back to Me (1953)
 The Price of Living (1954)
 It Happened in Mexico (1958)
 The Exterminating Angel (1962)
 The Partisan of Villa (1967)
 Corazón salvaje (1968)
 La endemoniada (1968)

References

External links

1906 births
1981 deaths
Spanish male film actors
Spanish male silent film actors
Spanish emigrants to Mexico
People from Valencia
20th-century Spanish male actors